I.H. Kempner High School, better known simply as Kempner High School, is a public high school in Sugar Land, Texas and a part of the Fort Bend Independent School District.

It was named after Isaac Herbert Kempner (1873–1967), the founder of the Imperial Sugar Corporation, which founded Sugar Land as a company-owned town in the early 1900s. Kempner serves areas within Sugar Land, including a portion of First Colony.

A small portion of the City of Houston is in the school's boundary. The motto for the school is "Knowledge, Honor, Success, we are KHS!”.

History

In 1984, Fort Bend ISD authorized a bond issue that allowed the construction of the fourth high school within the district.

Isaac Herbert Kempner, founder of Imperial Sugar, contributed much to the development of early Sugar Land. For this, the school was named after him. The first Kempner principal was decided by the board on January 11, 1988, to be Mr. Wayne Emerson. He was dedicated to his work and students. The anticipation was over when Kempner opened its doors to the first Open House on August 30, 1988, at 7:30 p.m. The $15,522,300 school contained 55.88 acres of pecan trees, a 750-seat auditorium, and 100 faculty and staff members. In 1990 Kempner graduated its first senior class. Kempner was FBISD's fourth comprehensive high school.

When Kempner first opened, the area surrounding it was isolated and mostly agricultural; in fact State Highway 6, which is located just to the west of Kempner, was only two-laned at the time. In the past years, the school has witnessed growth in both enrollment and suburban change in the surrounding areas. At one point Kempner had 3,000 enrolled students.

In the 1999–2000 school year, Dr. James May became the new principal following Dr. Wayne Emerson and served the students and staff of Kempner until his retirement in June 2008. Under Dr. May, Kempner continued its tradition of academic excellence and its reputation as a school for all students.
 
Troy Mooney became the 3rd principal of Kempner High School and served in that capacity until July 2010. During that time KHS achieved recognition as a Recognized High School from the Texas Education Agency as well as a 96th percentile National ranking from Newsweek magazine.

Student body

At one point (1995), Kempner had 3,000 students.

In the 2005–2006 school year, Kempner had a population of 2,616 students: 723 freshmen, 683 sophomores, 597 juniors, and 613 seniors.

Compared to other schools in the district, Kempner's student body features a diverse group of ethnicities, where not just one race predominates. According to the 2015–2016 Texas Education Agency, the student body comprises 37% non-Hispanic White, 30% Asian/Pacific Islander, 19% Hispanic, 13% African American, and <1% American Indian/Alaskan Native.

Culture
In 2013, Navjinder Singh, a worker at the Indian grocery shop Keemat Grocers who was quoted in The New York Times, stated that Kempner has hallways known for particular ethnic groups; for instance, "Desi hallway" refers to an area where students of Indian origins congregate.

Boundaries and feeder patterns
Kempner High School, which serves grades 9 through 12, is a part of the Fort Bend Independent School District. Kempner serves portions of Sugar Land and a very small section of Houston. Kempner serves a portion of the First Colony development. Most of Telfair is zoned to Kempner.

The attendance boundary included the Smithville housing complex, which was employee housing of the Central Prison Unit housing minor dependents of Texas Department of Criminal Justice (TDCJ) staff, until the unit's 2011 closure.

The following elementary schools feed into Kempner:
 Barrington Place (partial)
 Drabek
 Fleming (partial)
 Lakeview (partial)
 Sugar Mill
 Townewest

The following middle schools feed into Kempner:
 Hodges Bend (partial)
 Sugar Land

Notable alumni

 William Dominic "Billy" Austin, Class of 1993, played for the Indianapolis Colts 1998–2000.
 Chris Banjo, Class of 2008, undrafted free agent for Green Bay Packers
 James Fortune, Class of 1996, Gospel singer
 George Iloka, Class of 2008, drafted by Cincinnati Bengals
 Brittney Karbowski, Class of 2004, voice actress
 Ethan Kelley, Class of 1998, drafted by the New England Patriots in 2003, and currently (2006) plays for the Cleveland Browns.
 Maxo Kream, Class of 2008, rapper
 Diana López, Class of 2002, Olympic bronze medalist (Taekwondo), 2005 World Champion
 Jean Lopez, Class of 1991, Silver Medalist World Taekwondo Championships 1995, U.S. Olympic Coach 2004, 2008, 2012.
 Mark López, Class of 2000, Olympics silver medalist (Taekwondo), 2005 World Champion
 Steven López, Class of 1997, two-time Taekwondo Olympic gold medalist, 1 bronze.  People Magazine's "50 Most Beautiful People"
 Winslow Oliver, Class of 1991, played in NFL from 1996-2000 for the Carolina Panthers and Atlanta Falcons.
 Ashley Spillers, Class of 2004, actress
 Carl Grady "Tre" Thomas III, Class of 1993, played for the N.Y. Giants in 1999.

References

External links

 

Educational institutions established in 1988
1988 establishments in Texas
Fort Bend Independent School District high schools
Schools in Sugar Land, Texas